The only example of the German DRG Class 99.21 steam locomotive was built for the Wangerooge Island Railway on Wangerooge, one of the German-owned Friesian islands in the North Sea.

History 
For hauling eight-wheeled passenger coaches a more powerful locomotive was needed. After the procurement of diesel locomotives in 1958 she remained for a time as a reserve engine. She carried number 99 211.

Today the locomotive is restored and is displayed as a monument on Wangerooge.

Technical Details 
The inner frame of the locomotive was also used as a water tank. She was designed as a wet steam locomotive. The boiler had two shell rings and 90 heating tubes. The drive was achieved via a Walschaerts valve gear driving the third axle. The wheels on the centre axle were made without flanges to improve curve running. 

The engine could hold 0.6 tonnes of coal in side tanks either side of the boiler, and 1.8 m2 of water in the frame and in an attachment to the coal bunker.
The engine was first equipped with electrical lighting in 1953.

See also
 List of DRG locomotives and railbuses

References 

 

99.021
0-6-0T locomotives
99.021
Henschel locomotives
Railway locomotives introduced in 1929
Metre gauge steam locomotives
Individual locomotives of Germany
C n2t locomotives